The Sierra de Béjar is a mountain range near the center of the Iberian Peninsula.

Geography 

The highest point of the range is Canchal de la Ceja, at 2428 metres.

Some geographers consider Sierra de Béjar as the westernmost part of sierra de Gredos.

See also

 Sistema Central
 Béjar

Bibliography

References

Bejar
Geography of the Province of Ávila
Geography of the Province of Salamanca
Bejar